The Old Man River's City project was an architectural design created by Buckminster Fuller in 1971. Fuller was asked to design the structure by the city of East St. Louis. Old Man River's City would have been a truly  massive housing project for the city's 70,000 residents. The total capacity of the building, a circular multi-terraced dome, would be 125,000 occupants.

References

External links 
 A Community Dwelling Machine

Buckminster Fuller
Planned communities in the United States
Buildings and structures in St. Clair County, Illinois
East St. Louis, Illinois
1971 establishments in Illinois